The 85th Assembly District of Wisconsin is one of 99 districts in the Wisconsin State Assembly.  Located in north-central Wisconsin, the district comprises much of eastern Marathon County, including the cities of Wausau and Schofield, and the villages of Elderon, Hatley, and Rothschild.  The district is represented by Republican Patrick Snyder, since January 2017. 

The 85th Assembly District is located within Wisconsin's 29th Senate district, along with the 86th and 87th Assembly districts.

History
The district was created in the 1972 redistricting act (1971 Wisc. Act 304) which first established the numbered district system, replacing the previous system which allocated districts to specific counties.  The 85th district was drawn almost exactly in line with the previous Marathon County 2nd district (the cities of Wausau and Schofield, and north-central Marathon County.  The last representative of the Marathon County 2nd district, Tony Earl, went on to win the 1972 election as the first representative of the 85th Assembly district.  The district has remained in the same vicinity, centered on Wausau and Schofield, in the various redistricting schemes since 1972, with the exception of the 1982 court-ordered plan which temporarily moved the district to eastern Waupaca County.  The 2011 redistricting act was the most significant change to the boundaries of the district since 1982, maintaining Wausau and Schofield in the district, but shifting away from the north-central towns of Marathon County to encompass more of the rural eastern half of the county.

Notable former representatives of the 85th district include Tony Earl, who was later elected the 41st Governor of Wisconsin, and Gregory Huber, who was later appointed as a Wisconsin circuit court judge by Governor Jim Doyle and is now the current chief judge for the 9th judicial administrative district of Wisconsin.

List of past representatives

Electoral history

References 

Wisconsin State Assembly districts
Marathon County, Wisconsin